Mayo Field is a stadium in Rochester, Minnesota.  The ballpark is primarily used for baseball and is the home field of the Rochester Honkers baseball team.  The stadium is able to hold 3,570 people.

References

External links
 
 
 

Baseball venues in Minnesota
Minor league baseball venues
Buildings and structures in Rochester, Minnesota